Epichloë sinica is a hybrid asexual species in the fungal genus Epichloë. 

A systemic and seed-transmissible grass symbiont first described in 2009,  Epichloë sinica is a natural allopolyploid of Epichloë bromicola and a strain in the Epichloë typhina complex.

Epichloë sinica is found in Asia, where it has been identified in species of the grass genus Roegneria.

References 

sinica
Fungi described in 2009
Fungi of Asia